Simpsonichthys multiradiatus is a species of killifish from the family Rivulidae.
It is found in the Middle Tocantins River basin of Brazil in South America. This species reaches a length of 
.

References

Costa, W.J.E.M., 2003. Rivulidae (South American Annual Fishes). p. 526-548. In R.E. Reis, S.O. Kullander and C.J. Ferraris, Jr. (eds.) Checklist of the Freshwater Fishes of South and Central America. Porto Alegre: EDIPUCRS, Brasil.

multiradiatus
Taxa named by Wilson José Eduardo Moreira da Costa
Taxa named by Gilberto Campello Brasil
Fish described in 1994